Walter Lackner is an Austrian para-alpine skier. He represented Austria at the 2002 Winter Paralympics and at the 2006 Winter Paralympics.

In 2006 he won the gold medal in the Men's Super-G Standing event and the bronze medal in the Men's Downhill Standing event.

He also finished in 3rd place in Men's Standing at the 2007 IPC Alpine Skiing World Cup.

See also 
 List of Paralympic medalists in alpine skiing

References 

Living people
Year of birth missing (living people)
Place of birth missing (living people)
Paralympic alpine skiers of Austria
Alpine skiers at the 2002 Winter Paralympics
Alpine skiers at the 2006 Winter Paralympics
Medalists at the 2006 Winter Paralympics
Paralympic gold medalists for Austria
Paralympic bronze medalists for Austria
Paralympic medalists in alpine skiing
21st-century Austrian people